Breakthrough and Milestones Productions International Inc. (abbreviated as BMPI) is a Filipino-owned media company, providing services for radio, television, motion picture, print, publications, Internet Broadcast, audio recording, photography and talent management since 2004.

Background 
BMPI's principal activities include TV production and media network management, events management, advertising, and marketing. BMPI is the current marketing firm and content provider of Progressive Broadcasting Corporation's television and radio stations including UNTV News and Rescue, and Wish 107.5 in Mega Manila and Cebu. It also manages the programming and content of Radyo La Verdad 1350 (UNTV Radio). BMPI also established their own talent development center, known as BMPI Talent Center in 2018.

The company's chairman and CEO is veteran broadcaster Daniel S. Razon.

Filmography
Isang Araw Lang
Isang Araw: Ikalawang Yugto
Isang Araw: Ikatlong Yugto

See also
Progressive Broadcasting Corporation

References

Progressive Broadcasting Corporation
Mass media companies established in 2004
Companies based in Quezon City
Mass media companies of the Philippines